883Jia is a Singaporean Chinese-language radio station owned by So Drama! Entertainment. It plays Mandarin, Korean, Japanese and English music from the 1980s up to the 2020s. 88.3Jia first rode the airwaves in 1995, before relaunching in 2007 as Singapore's only bilingual station. Featuring both Mandarin and English hits as it main songs list round the clock, it’s now bigger and better as the “upsized” 88.3Jia experience offers more of everything.

See also
List of radio stations in Singapore

References

External links

1995 establishments in Singapore
Radio stations in Singapore
Mandarin-language radio stations
Radio stations established in 1995